is a Japanese football player. He plays for Nagano Parceiro.

Club statistics
Updated to 23 February 2017.

References

External links

Profile at Nagano Parceiro

1994 births
Living people
Association football people from Fukuoka Prefecture
Japanese footballers
J2 League players
J3 League players
Fagiano Okayama players
AC Nagano Parceiro players
Association football forwards